The IEEE Power & Energy magazine (formerly IEEE Power Engineering Review) is a magazine published by the IEEE Power & Energy Society. Feature articles focus on advanced concepts, technologies, and practices associated with all aspects of electric power from a technical perspective in synergy with nontechnical areas such as business, environmental, and social concerns.

The current editor is Melvin I. Olken, and the 2013 impact factor was 1.43.

References

Power and Energy